Bradley Wilson Sorensen  (born March 13, 1988) is a former American football quarterback who played in the National Football League (NFL). He was drafted by the San Diego Chargers in the seventh round of the 2013 NFL Draft. He played college football at Southern Utah.

College career
Sorensen redshirted at Brigham Young University, but transferred to Southern Utah to gain playing time. He started quarterback for the Thunderbirds from 2010 until 2012. He has the school's all-time marks in passing yards (9,445) and touchdown passes (61). He also became the school's first 3,000-yard passer in a season, which he did all three years he played at SUU.

Professional career

San Diego Chargers 
The San Diego Chargers selected Sorensen in the seventh round (221st overall) of the 2013 NFL Draft. He became Southern Utah's first player to be selected in the NFL Draft in school history. He was released on August 29, 2014.

Tennessee Titans 
Sorensen had a brief spell with the Tennessee Titans in September 2014, reuniting him with former Chargers Coach Ken Whisenhunt.

Second stint with Chargers 
Following his release in Tennessee, he was re-signed to the Chargers practice squad in December 2014. He was released again from the Chargers on October 1, 2015. San Diego re-signed Sorensen to their practice squad on October 24. On December 12, 2015, he was promoted to the active roster. On December 14, Sorensen was waived. On December 16th he was re-signed by the Chargers. On December 17, he was once again waived. He was later re-signed on December 18 to the practice squad.

Minnesota Vikings
On August 20, 2016, Sorensen signed with the Minnesota Vikings.  He was released by the team on August 29, 2016.  After starting quarterback Teddy Bridgewater was injured during practice, the Vikings re-signed Sorensen. On September 3, 2016, he was released again by the Vikings when the team traded for Philadelphia Eagles quarterback Sam Bradford.

Personal life
Sorensen has four brothers named Trevan, Bryan, Cody, Daniel, and one sister named Emily. The youngest brother, Daniel Sorensen, played college football at BYU and currently plays safety for the New Orleans Saints.

References

External links
San Diego Chargers bio
Southern Utah bio

1988 births
Living people
American football quarterbacks
Minnesota Vikings players
People from Colton, California
Players of American football from California
San Diego Chargers players
Southern Utah Thunderbirds football players
Sportspeople from San Bernardino County, California
Tennessee Titans players